The , officially called , is an automated monorail in Japan, which operates between Maihama Station and the Tokyo Disney Resort.

Legally speaking, the line is built as a "railway", just like ordinary rapid transits or commuter rail lines. As such, season tickets are available, and Pasmo and Suica IC cards can also be used on this line. In reality, the line mostly functions as the gateway attraction of the Disney Resort, and all of the stations are located on the private property of Oriental Land.

Stations

Trains on the loop line travel in one direction only, taking approximately 13 minutes to make one circuit. All trains stop at all stations.

Resort Gateway Station

Tokyo Disneyland Station

Bayside Station

Tokyo DisneySea Station 

Officially, it is not possible to leave the resort from this station, but an exit does exist (from DisneySea itself), allowing access to Urayasu Heliport, Urayasu City Clean Center, Urayasu Civil Sports Park, and Urayasu Funeral Hall.

Rolling stock

The line is operated using a fleet of five unclassified 6-car "Resort Liner" monorail trains built by Hitachi Rail. Each train is finished in a different colour. Up to four trains operate on the loop at one time, running with a minimum headway of approximately 3 minutes. Starting in 2020, the trains will be replaced with new sets featuring the same exterior colours.

History
The line opened to passengers on 27 July 2001, two months before the opening of Tokyo DisneySea. The Pasmo IC card ticketing system was introduced on the line from 14 March 2009.

Fares
The line charges a flat fare of 260 yen per passenger for any trip. Guests aged 6–11 ride at half fare and under-6s may ride for free (two per paying adult). Passes valid for unlimited rides for one to four days and one, three, and six months are also sold.

Ridership statistics
The annual ridership figures for the line are as shown below.

See also

Disneyland Monorail System
Monorails in Japan
Rail transport in Walt Disney Parks and Resorts
Walt Disney World Monorail System

References

External links

Official website by Oriental Land  
Official website by Oriental Land 
Official website by Tokyo Disney Resort  
Official website by Tokyo Disney Resort 

Monorails
Alweg people movers
Monorails in Japan
Railway lines in Chiba Prefecture
Rail transport in Walt Disney Parks and Resorts
Railway lines opened in 2001
Railways of amusement parks in Japan
Tokyo Disney Resort